Estación Tapia or Tapia is a village or populated centre in the Canelones Department of southern Uruguay.

Geography

Location
The railroad track Montevideo - Minas passes by the southeast limits of the village and the stream Arroyo de los Negros flows southwest of it.

Population
In 2011 Estación Tapia had a population of 213.
 
Source: Instituto Nacional de Estadística de Uruguay

References

External links
INE map of Estación Tapia

Populated places in the Canelones Department